Elhayi Rural District is a rural district (dehestan) in the Central District of Ahvaz County, Khuzestan Province, Iran. At the 2006 census, its population was 17,074, in 2,834 families.  The rural district has 45 villages.

References 

Rural Districts of Khuzestan Province
Ahvaz County